Reflections is the 2004 final studio album of Miriam Makeba. It won three prizes at the South African Music Awards in 2004.

Track listing
All tracks composed by Miriam Makeba; except where indicated
"Where Are You Going?"	(Hugh Masekela) - 4:00
"I'm In Love With Spring" (George Patterson, William Salter) -	3:27
"Mas Que Nada"	Jorge Ben 3:15
"Xica Da Silva"	Jorge Ben 6:10
"Click Song"	4:53
"Pata Pata"	3:23
"Quit It" (Bongi Makeba, Caiphus Semenya) -	5:30
"Comme Une Symphonie D'Amour"	3:16
"Iyaguduza"	6:22
"African Convention" (Hugh Masekela) -	4:59
"Ring Bell" (Jerry Ragovoy) -	3:15
"I Shall Sing"	(Van Morrison) - 7:10
"Love Tastes Like Strawberries"	5:05

References

2004 albums
Miriam Makeba albums